Hermias (Hermeias ek Phoinikes) was a Neoplatonist philosopher who was born in Alexandria c. 410 AD.  He went to Athens and studied philosophy under Syrianus. He married Aedesia, who was a relative of Syrianus, and who had originally been betrothed to Proclus, but Proclus broke the engagement off after receiving a divine warning. Hermias brought Syrianus' teachings back to Alexandria, where he lectured in the school of Horapollo, receiving an income from the state. He died c. 450 AD, at a time when his children, Ammonius and Heliodorus, were still small. Aedesia, however, continued to receive an income from the state, in order to raise the children, enabling them to become philosophers.

A Commentary on the Phaedrus written by Hermias survives. It consists of notes based on the lectures conducted by Syrianus concerning Plato's Phaedrus.

References
 Gertz, S., (2019), "Hermias on the Argument for Immortality in Plato’s Phaedrus". In: Studies in Hermias’ Commentary on Plato’s Phaedrus. Brill: Leiden.
Sorabji, R., (2005), The Philosophy of the Commentators, 200-600 AD, Cornell University Press.
Uzdavinys, A., (2004), The Golden Chain: An Anthology of Pythagorean and Platonic Philosophy. World Wisdom, Inc.

External links

5th-century Byzantine people
5th-century philosophers
Commentators on Plato
Neoplatonists
Ancient Roman philosophers
5th-century births
450 deaths
Roman-era students in Athens
5th-century Byzantine writers
Late-Roman-era pagans